= Piet Worm =

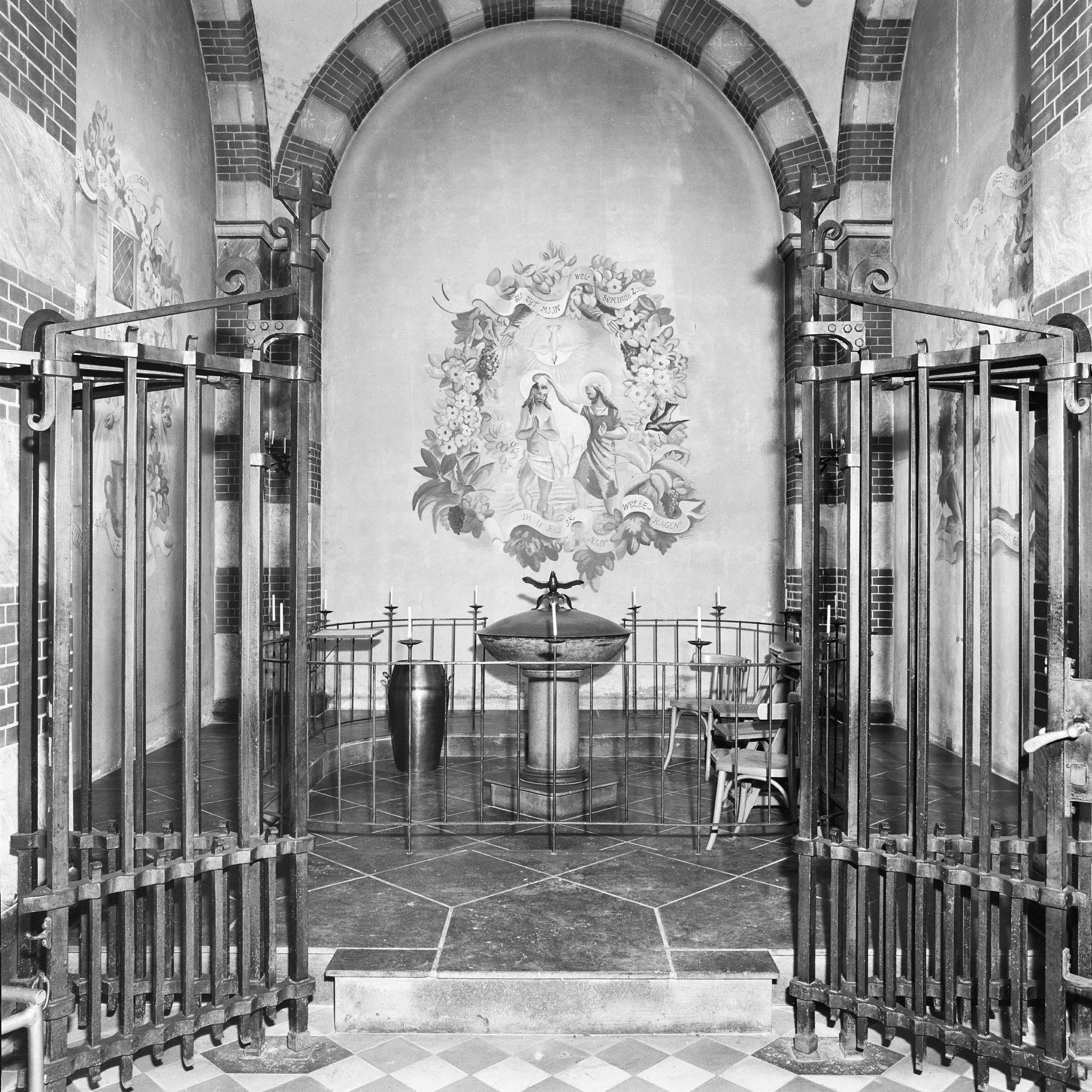
Roman Catholic Church of Our Lady: interior of the baptistery (front view), baptismal font, and painting by Piet Worm.

Petrus Johannes Franciscus Maria "Piet" Worm (September 17, 1909 – May 7, 1996) was a Dutch artist and illustrator. He began his career as an architect and became an illustrator of children's books.

Worm was born in 1909 in Alkmaar, Netherlands. He studied at the School of Applied Arts in Haarlem, the School for Art, Technology and Craft in The Hague, and the Royal Academy of Visual Arts in Amsterdam.

During World War II, he began illustrating children's books. He worked with writer Bertus Aafjes on "Peter-Kersten-eter" (Peter, cherry eater) in 1943. He also created comic strips with Aafjes which were later published in book form. He also he drew the comic Professor Zegellak with text by Daan Zonderland.

He also wrote and illustrated a series of children's books about three little horses, including "Three Little Horses" (1953), "Three Little Horses at the King's Palace" (1959), and "Three Little Horses Have a Holiday" (1961). In a 1954 review of the first book, The Atlantic called it "one of the most delightful" and tallest books, one that "has a European flavor of fantasy that makes the story almost sing from page to page. Hilariously ridiculous, and that's just what children love."

He also wrote and illustrated children's books based on Bible stories, including "Stories from the Old Testament" (1956) and "More Stories from the Old Testament", "Stories from the New Testament" (1958), and "The Children's Bible".

He also created illustrations for a book about Josephine Baker's adopted children "The Rainbow Children" (1957).
